The Chepachet River is a river in the U.S. state of Rhode Island. It flows . There are eight dams along the river's length.

Course
The river rises from Cherry Valley Pond in Glocester. From there it flows to Keech Pond and Smith & Sayles Reservoir, then north to Burrillville where it converges with the Clear River to form the Branch River.

Crossings
Below is a list of all crossings over the Chepachet River. The list starts at the headwaters and goes downstream.
Glocester
Chopmist Hill Road (RI 102)
Lake View Drive
Chestnut Hill Road
Putnam Pike (RI 102/U.S. 44)
Burrillville
Gazza Road
Mapleville Main Street

Tributaries
In addition to many unnamed tributaries, the following brooks also feed the Chepachet:
Peckham Brook
Saunders Brook
Stingo Brook
Sucker Brook

See also
List of rivers of Rhode Island

References
Maps from the United States Geological Survey

Rivers of Providence County, Rhode Island
Rivers of Rhode Island
Tributaries of Providence River